Tatrovice is a municipality and village in Sokolov District in the Karlovy Vary Region of the Czech Republic. It has about 200 inhabitants.

References

Villages in Sokolov District